Lings Forum is a leisure centre located in the suburbs of Northampton, England. It is annexed to Weston Favell Shopping Centre and Northampton Academy. The forum has a gym, swimming-pool, sporting arena and a one screen cinema.

References

Sports venues in Northampton